Walter Baker may refer to:

 Walter Arnold Baker (1937–2010), Kentucky legislator and justice of the Kentucky Supreme Court
 Walter Baker (British politician) (1876–1930), British Labour Party politician, MP for Bristol East 1923–1930
 Walter Baker (Canadian politician) (1930–1983), Canadian parliamentarian and lawyer
 Walter Ransom Gail Baker (1892–1960), American electrical engineer
 Walter M. Baker (1927–2012), Maryland State Senator
 Walter Reginald Baker (1852–?), Canadian businessman
 Walter Thane Baker (born 1931), American track and field athlete

See also 
 Baker (surname)